For the Europe of the Peoples (PEP) was a Spanish electoral list in the European Parliament election in 1994 made up from regionalist parties. It was the successor of the 1989 coalition of the same name.

Composition

Electoral performance

European Parliament

Defunct political party alliances in Spain
Regionalist parties in Spain